The Griebnitz Canal, formerly known as the Prinz-Friedrich-Leopold-Kanal, is a canal in the western suburbs of Berlin, the capital city of Germany. It consists of a chain of small lakes: the Stölpchensee, Pohlesee, and Kleiner Wannsee, together with artificial channels linking them together.

The canal connects the Griebnitzsee, a lake on the course of the Teltow Canal, with the Großer Wannsee, a lake on the course of the River Havel.

References

External links

Canals in Berlin
Buildings and structures in Steglitz-Zehlendorf
Federal waterways in Germany
Canals opened in 1906
CGriebnitz
1906 establishments in Germany